Cartridge Creek is a creek near Fresno, California. It terminates in the Middle Fork Kings River. The creek is part of Kings Canyon National Park. A pass above the headwaters of the creek has an old sheep trail over it. The creek was named by Frank Lewis while on a hunting trip in the 1870s. The following quote records the event: "While hunting with a young friend, Harrison Hill, I wounded a bear and told him to finish it. He became excited and threw all the shells out of his Winchester without firing a shot."

References

Rivers of Northern California
Rivers of Fresno County, California